Chehel Dokhtar Castle may refer to:

 Chehel Dokhtar Castle, Iranshahr
 Chehel Dokhtar Castle, Qaen